The following railroads operate in the U.S. state of West Virginia.

Common freight carriers
Appalachian and Ohio Railroad (AO)
Beech Mountain Railroad (BEEM)
CSX Transportation (CSXT)
Durbin and Greenbrier Valley Railroad (DGVR) operates Durbin Railroad and West Virginia Central Railroad (WVC)
Elk River Railroad (ELKR)
Kanawha River Railroad (KNWA)
Norfolk Southern Railway (NS)
R.J. Corman Railroad/West Virginia Line (RJCV)
South Branch Valley Railroad (SBVR)
Wheeling and Lake Erie Railway (WE)
Winchester and Western Railroad (WW)

Private freight carriers
Little Kanawha River Rail, Inc. (LKRR)
Short Line Services operates Big Eagle Rail, LLC, lessor of Kanawha Rail Corporation
Kanawha River Terminal Railroad (KRT)

Passenger carriers
Amtrak (AMTK)
Cass Scenic Railroad
Durbin and Greenbrier Valley Railroad
MARC
Potomac Eagle Scenic Railroad
South Branch Valley Railroad

Defunct railroads

Electric
Appalachian Power Company
Charleston–Dunbar Traction Company
Charleston Interurban Railroad
City Railway
East Liverpool Traction and Light Company
Grafton Light and Power Company
Kanawha Traction and Electric Company
Lewisburg and Ronceverte Electric Railway
Monongahela Valley Traction Company
Morgantown and Pittsburgh Railway
Morgantown and Wheeling Railway
Newell Bridge and Railway Company
Ohio Valley Electric Railway
Pan Handle Traction Company
Parkersburg and Ohio Valley Electric Railway
Princeton Power Company
South Morgantown Traction Company
Steubenville, East Liverpool and Beaver Valley Traction Company
Steubenville, Wellsburg and Weirton Railway
Tyler Traction Company
Union Traction Company
Wellsburg, Bethany and Washington Railway
West Virginia Traction and Electric Company
Wheeling and Elm Grove Railway
Wheeling Traction Company

Notes

West Virginia
Railroads